Spring Pond, United States, (formerly known as "Mineral Spring", "Mineral Pond"  and the "little lake of Lynnmere") abuts the three cities of Lynn, Peabody (formerly Danvers) and Salem.  In the center of these townships "is a beautiful pond". It is a secluded lake known by residents of the three cities and visitors who come to enjoy the camps, trails and natural environment of the woods. "It is in fact one of the most picturesque and romantic lakelets in Massachusetts". Stretching from Spring Pond to Marlborough Road in Salem, the pond and woods form a microcosm of beauty. On the edge of Spring Pond was once the Fay Farm, an English manor estate in New England.  The mansion of Fay Farm was a well-known hotel in 1810, when the springs of these areas were believed to possess medicinal qualities. People visited the springs near Spring Pond to restore health, and worship the goddess Hygeia and drink from the rusty iron-rich water trickling from the foot of a bank. Later, some traveled there solely for fun and frolic. The hotel was then converted into a private residence.  The waters of Spring Pond are conveyed by springs from an aquifer lying below Spring Pond (and its surrounding area) through Peabody, Lynn and Salem. Spring Pond is listed as one of the "Massachusetts Great Ponds".

History
In 1669 (and again in 1793), colonial divisions between townships were drawn using the spring at Spring Pond as the benchmark to create the city boundaries; Spring Pond supplied water to Danvers (now Peabody), Lynn and Salem. In 1669, the spring was used to establish the boundary between Lynn and Salem; in 1793 (when Salem divided, forming another township) the borders were redefined based on the spring. The stone benchmark remains in the water of Spring Pond, engraved with the initials of each township: L (for Lynn), P (for Peabody) and S (for Salem). In 1793 Spring Pond was divided among three towns: Peabody (once Danvers), Salem and Lynn (once Saugus). The spring was the boundary of the colonial division line of the townships. The dividing line left valuable, arable land on one side of the town boundary and separated the Mansion House and buildings in Lynn.

"Lo", a Native American, was killed around 1676 by John Flint, a soldier in the war against King Philip by the Wampanoags, near the pond (at the present border of Lynn and Salem). Legend says that he was the first (and only) Native American killed in the area; his body and bones nourished the shrubs and trees near Spring Pond.

Before 1704, early settlement of the area included Jacob and Elizabeth (John Clifford) Allen of Salem (and their daughter Elizabeth) as recorded landowners near what was then known as Lynn Mineral Spring Pond.

During the Third Plantation of the Massachusetts Bay Colony (in about 1704) John Casper Richter Von Crowninshield (Johannes Kaspar Richter Von Kronenscheldt, as first spelled), a German physician, settled on the hillsides near Spring Pond on land purchased from Elizabeth Allen (partly in Salem and partly in Lynn). Among Crowninshield's descendants were George Crowninshield, who founded the Crowninshield & Sons shipping business and whose family built Crowninshield’s Wharf in Salem. Benjamin Williams Crowninshield served as United States Secretary of the Navy, Representative in Congress, member of the Massachusetts State Senate and House of Representatives, and became one of the first directors of the Merchant's Bank of Salem; he founded East India Trade of Salem, and the USS Crowninshield naval destroyer was named in his honor. George Crowninshield Jr. built and sailed the yacht Cleopatra’s Barge. Louise E. du Pont Crowninshield, wife of Francis Boardman Crowninshield, was one of America's first historical preservationists and a founding member of the National Trust for Historic Preservation.

In 1810 the Twin Springs Hotel (later known as the Mineral Spring Hotel, part of the Crowninshield estate and the Fay Estate Mansion of Lynn) was built near the spring, whose water was rich in iron and believed to possess medicinal qualities. Patients traveled great distances to drink the water and, for a time, to worship the goddess Hygeia to restore their health. This "classical worship" damaged the hotel's reputation, and it was later converted into the private summer residence of Richard Sullivan Fay. From 1847–1865 Fay (an Anglo-American farmer, merchant and manufacturer) lived on a  estate on the hillsides surrounding Spring Pond partly in Lynn (the present Fay Estate), partly in present-day Salem (the present Camp Lion and WalMart, extending to Danvers Road), growing in his arboretum (which was open to the public) a variety of rare and exotic trees and shrubs imported from other parts of the world; many arrived here first in the United States, among them the American tulip tree. Some descendants of Fay's trees and shrubs continue to grow near Spring Pond, although most of the rare trees were cut by a lumber company in 1910. In 1862, Fay commissioned an army at his own expense. Officers and members of the 38th Regiment of Massachusetts named the company the “Fay Light Guard”. It was attached to the 39th Massachusetts Regiment and fought at Port Hudson, Cane River, Mansion Plains, Winchester, Fisher’s Hill and Cedar Creek.

Drinking water
The Journal of the Boston Society of Civil Engineers (vol. 3) reported that "In 1851 a  main  in length was constructed to bring water by gravity from Spring Pond in Peabody, one of the present sources of supply of that town.

Spring Pond in literature

Notable residents
Alonzo Lewis: Writer, poet, teacher, reporter, artist, surveyor and Lynn's first historian, was strongly attracted to Spring Pond (or Mineral Spring, as it was then known). Lewis published a drawing and published articles about the Mineral Spring Hotel and its surrounding wooded areas. Lewis wrote The History of Lynn, which was sold in four parts; the third is entitled Lynn Mineral Spring Hotel, or (as modern Lynn calls it) the Fay Estate.
 Casper Van Crowninshield: Owned and settled on the lands near Spring Pond in retreat and for farming.  He hailed from Germany;  eminent citizens were entertained at his retreat, including Cotton Mather.
Cotton Mather and his father Increase Mather: Both were visitors to the Spring Pond retreat and the adjacent lands of Casper Van Crowninshield. One of Cotton Mather's works (his memoir of his father) extols the virtues of the Spring Pond area. In it, he describes the healing waters and retreat under the trees of the area. Cotton Mather was a New England Puritan minister, author of more than 450 books, whose writings were influential in the Salem witch trials.
 Elias Trask (Captain John, William Traske): Born in Salem in 1679, of Trask's farm adjoining Spring Pond and Long Pond
 Elizabeth, daughter of Jacob and Elizabeth (Clifford) Allen of Salem, Massachusetts
 James R. Newhall: Writer, literary executor to Alonzo Lewis and one of Lynn's first historians, he was attracted to the Spring Pond region.
 William Bentley: Early 19th-century diarist

Increase Mather's Diaries of Spring Pond
Parentator or Remarkables of Dr. Increase Mather, by Cotton Mather, was published in 1724.
In his book, Cotton Mather shares excerpts from the diary of his father, Increase Mather, concerning the latter's recovery from illness due to the healing waters of Mineral Spring Pond (as it was then known). Some excerpts follow:

Bibliography
Quest for Survival: An appreciation of Local Wildflowers, Lynn, Salem & Peabody Massachusetts, by Leslie Courtemanche of Lynn, Massachusetts, an Author of Nature for Spring Pond, Photographer and Conservationist
Heritage and Habitat Lost: A Collection of Thoughts and Photographs of the Spring Pond, Area of Lynn, Salem and Peabody, Massachusetts, by Leslie Courtemanche of Lynn, Massachusetts, an Author of Nature for Spring Pond, Photographer and Conservationist
The Register of the Lynn Historical Society, Volumes 16-18, by Lynn Historical Society, Lynn Massachusetts
Country Arts in Early American Homes,  by Nina Fletcher Little
History of Lynn, Essex County: Massachusetts including Lynnfield ..., Volume 1, by Alonzo Lewis, and James Robinson Newhall
The History of Salem, Massachusetts, Volume 1, by Sidney Perley
History of Essex County, Massachusetts: with ..., Volume 1, Issue 1, by Duane Hamilton Hurd
History of Essex County, Massachusetts: with ..., Volume 2, Part 1, by Duane Hamilton Hurd
Collections of the Massachusetts Historical Society, by Massachusetts Historical Society
Collectections of the Massachusetts Historical Society for the Year 1799
Bulletin of the Essex County Ornithological Club of Massachusetts, Volumes 1-6, by Essex County Ornithological Club of Massachusetts
Massachusetts Wildlife, by Massachusetts. Division of Fisheries and Game, Massachusetts. Division of Fisheries and Wildlife
The Flora of Essex County, Massachusetts, by John Robinson
The Diary of William Bentley D.D., Pastor of the East Church, Salem, by William Bentley, Joseph Gilbert Waters, Marguerite Dalrymple, Alice G. Waters, Essex Institute
The Physical Geography, Geology, Mineralogy and Paleontology of Essex County
The Peabody Story: Events in Peabody's History, 1626-1972, by John Andrew Wells
The New England Historical and Genealogical Register, Volume 56,  by Henry Fitz-Gilbert Waters, New England Historic Genealogical Society
The Fifth Half Century of the Landing of John Endicott at Salem, Massachusetts,  by Essex Institute
Historical Collections of the Essex institute, by Salem Mass, Essex inst
Rhodora, Volume 4, by Benjamin Lincoln Robinson, Merritt Lyndon Fernald, A book about the plants of the Mineral-Spring Pond area
The Diary and Letters of Benjamin Pickman (1740–1819) of Salem, Massachusetts, by Benjamin Pickman
The Lynn Album: A Pictorial History, 1990, by Elizabeth Hope Cushing 
The New England Farmer, Volume 10, by Samuel W. Cole
Parentator or Remarkables of Dr. Increase Mather, by Cotton Mather, Published 1724
Bronsdon and Box families, by Lucius Bolles Marsh, Harriet Moncrief Kinmonth Fitts Parker
 Recreation in and about Boston: a handbook of opportunities by Prospect Union Association, Cambridge, Massachusetts

References

Ponds of Massachusetts
Lakes of Essex County, Massachusetts
Lynn, Massachusetts
Peabody, Massachusetts
Salem, Massachusetts